Lance Dobson (26 February 1921 – 13 April 1992) was an  Australian rules footballer who played with North Melbourne in the Victorian Football League (VFL).

Notes

External links 

1921 births
1992 deaths
Australian rules footballers from Victoria (Australia)
Australian Rules footballers: place kick exponents
North Melbourne Football Club players
Port Melbourne Football Club players